Castelnuovo Scrivia is a comune (municipality) in the Province of Alessandria in the Italian region Piedmont, located about  east of Turin and about  northeast of Alessandria.

History
The city was fortified around 500 CE by order of Theoderic the Great, king of the Ostrogoths, and in 722 it was enlarged by the Lombard king Liutprand. An ally of Frederick Barbarossa in his war against the Lombardy communes, it took part in the destruction of Tortona in 1115, obtaining certain privileges in exchange. Around 1300 Castelnuovo became part of the Duchy of Milan.

In 1570 it changed name from Castelnuovo di Tortona  to Castelnuovo Scrivia, and become a fief of the Marini family and, after their extinction in 1778, of the Centurione family.

Main sights
The parish church, in Romanesque style, dates to the 12th century although restored in the 16th and 19th century. It has a portal with medieval lions sculptures, lunette and capitals executed in Frederick Barbarossa times. The interior, on a nave and two aisles, houses a 15th-century fresco with the Madonna of the Misericordia and four 11th-century capitals from the old pieve. Moreover, in the "Corpus Domini" chapel, there is a 16th-century painting by Alessandro Berri, representing "The Last Supper". It is a copy of the famous mural painting "The Last Supper" by Leonardo da Vinci.
Palazzo Pretorio (castle of the Torriani and Bandello families) has an ogival portico, with mullioned windows. The upper storey has 11th- and 16th-century frescoes.
Church of Sant'Ignazio (17th century)
Palazzo Centurione (17th century), in Genoese style. It houses the city museum

Notable people

 Matteo Bandello (c.1480–1562), writer.
 Alessandro Berri (c. 1600), painter
 Cesare Zerba (1892–1973), Roman Catholic cardinal.
 Vittorio Malosti (1900–1945). Artisan, killed one month after the end of World War II. The location of his body and the identity of his murderers were never revealed.

Twin towns
 Port-Sainte-Marie, France
 Santa Domenica Talao, Italy

References

External links
 https://www.comune.castelnuovoscrivia.al.it/

Castelnuovo Scrivia